This group is empty.

References

D51